Menaspis is an extinct genus of holocephalian cartilaginous fish from the Permian.

References

Aquagenesis: The Origin and Evolution of Life in the Sea by Richard Ellis  
 Rocks and Fossils: A Visual Guide (Visual Guides) by Robert R. Coenraads

Holocephali
Prehistoric cartilaginous fish genera
Permian cartilaginous fish
Fossils of Germany
Kupferschiefer